The 1905 Miami Redskins football team was an American football team that represented Miami University during the 1905 college football season. Miami compiled a 4–3 record during the season. Every game of the season is listed by Miami to be a shutout.

Schedule

Notes

References

Miami
Miami RedHawks football seasons
Miami Redskins football